Carlos Martí is a Cuban baseball manager. He managed the Alazanes de Granma in the Cuban National Series and the Cuba national baseball team in the 2017 World Baseball Classic.

References

Living people
Baseball managers
World Baseball Classic managers
Year of birth missing (living people)